Acanthodoxus machacalis is a species of longhorn beetles of the subfamily Lamiinae. It was described by Martins and Monné in 1974, and is known from Brazil.

References

Beetles described in 1974
Endemic fauna of Brazil
Acanthocinini